Helen Rebecca Jenkins, née Tucker  (born 8 March 1984) is Two-time Triathlon World Champion (2008 & 2011) Helen Jenkins is one of Britain’s most celebrated triathletes having represented Team GB at the Olympic Games (2008, 2012 & 2016) and World Championships (since 2009) and Wales at the Commonwealth Games.

Career 

Jenkins was the British Junior Champion of the year 2003 and the Elite Champion of the year 2006, after having been the elite silver medalist of the year 2005. Jenkins also participated in several prestigious non ITU events, in 2009 for instance she won the London Triathlon, which she had already attended in the years 2003, 2004, and 2005, placing 7th, 5th, and 5th respectively.

In 2006, she suffered from an Achilles tendon injury and after a new start in 2007 the ankle injury gave her trouble again. Nevertheless, in 2008 she won the World Championships in Vancouver and placed 21st at the Olympic Games in Beijing.

She again represented Great Britain at the 2012 Summer Olympics, finishing in 5th place.

She was appointed a Member of the Order of the British Empire (MBE) in the 2019 New Year Honours for services to Triathlon.

Following the birth of her second child and also recovering from back surgery which stopped her from competing for four years. Through immense strength and determination, Helen has now determined to return to professional racing and competing at the highest level. Helen’s first race back was Ironman 70.3 Dubai, where she finished 4th. Helen is partnered on her return to racing by HUUB, On Running, Vitus bikes and Clif nutrition and supported by Enve Wheels, Stages Cycling, Continental tyres and Oakley.

Personal life 
Jenkins was raised in Bridgend, Wales. She married her friend and coach Marc Jenkins at Disney World in Orlando on 30 October 2008.

ITU Competitions 
In the nine years from 2002 to 2010, Helen Jenkins took part in 42 ITU competitions and achieved 28 top ten positions, among which 14 medals.

The following list is based upon the official ITU rankings and the Athlete's Profile Page. Unless indicated otherwise, the following events are triathlons and belong to the Elite category.

BG = the sponsor British Gas · DNF = did not finish · DNS = did not start

Notes

External links 

 

1984 births
Living people
Sportspeople from Bridgend
Welsh female triathletes
Scottish female triathletes
Triathletes at the 2008 Summer Olympics
Olympic triathletes of Great Britain
Commonwealth Games competitors for Wales
Triathletes at the 2006 Commonwealth Games
People from Elgin, Moray
Triathletes at the 2012 Summer Olympics
Triathletes at the 2016 Summer Olympics
Members of the Order of the British Empire
Sportspeople from Moray